Dikoleps is a genus of sea snails, marine gastropod mollusks in the family Skeneidae.

Description
Species in this genus are characterized by an outer lip with a shallow sinus.

Species
Species within the genus Dikoleps include:
 Dikoleps cutleriana (Clark, 1848)
 Dikoleps depressa (Monterosato, 1880)
 Dikoleps marianae (Rubio, Dantart & Luque, 1998)
 Dikoleps nitens (Philippi, 1844)
 Dikoleps pruinosa (Chaster, 1896)
 Dikoleps rolani (Rubio, Dantart & Luque, 1998)
 Dikoleps templadoi Rubio, Dantart & Luque, 2004
 Dikoleps umbilicostriata (Gaglini, 1987)
Species brought into synonymy
 Dikoleps pusilla (Jeffreys, 1847)  synonym of  Dikoleps nitens (Philippi, 1844)

References

 Høisaeter T. (1968). Taxonomic notes on the North-European species of Cyclostrema sensu Jeffreys, 1863 (Prosobranchia: Diotocardia). Sarsia 33: 43-58
 Howson, C.M.; Picton, B.E. (Ed.) (1997). The species directory of the marine fauna and flora of the British Isles and surrounding seas. Ulster Museum Publication, 276. The Ulster Museum: Belfast, UK. . vi, 508 (+ cd-rom) 
 Gofas, S.; Le Renard, J.; Bouchet, P. (2001). Mollusca, in: Costello, M.J. et al. (Ed.) (2001). European register of marine species: a check-list of the marine species in Europe and a bibliography of guides to their identification. Collection Patrimoines Naturels, 50: pp. 180–213

 
Skeneidae
Gastropod genera